John Ker, 1st Duke of Roxburghe, KG, PC, FRS (30 April 1680–27 February 1741) was a Scottish nobleman.

Early life
Ker was born on 30 April 1680.  He was the second son of Robert Ker, 3rd Earl of Roxburghe, and Margaret Hay, daughter of John Hay, 1st Marquess of Tweeddale. His older brother was Robert Ker, 4th Earl of Roxburghe, and his younger brother was The Hon. William Ker, who fought on the Continent under the Duke of Marlborough and was present at the Battle of Sheriffmuir. He served as Groom of the Bedchamber to the Prince of Wales in 1714, and was a Member of Parliament for Berwick and Dysart Burghs.

John became 5th Earl of Roxburghe on the death of his elder brother Robert in 1696.

Career
In 1704, he was made a Secretary of State of Scotland, and he helped to bring about the union with England, being created Duke of Roxburghe in 1707 for his services in this connection. This was the last creation in the Scottish peerage. On 28 May 1707, he was admitted a FRS.

The duke was a representative peer for Scotland in four parliaments. George I made him a privy councillor and Keeper of the Privy Seal of Scotland, and he was loyal to the king during the Jacobite rising in 1715. He served as Secretary of State for Scotland in the British Parliament from 1716 to 1725, but he opposed the malt tax, and in 1725 Sir Robert Walpole procured his dismissal from office.

In April 1727, he was one of the six pall-bearers of Sir Isaac Newton's coffin at Westminster Abbey. He was one of the original governors of the Foundling Hospital, a charity created by royal charter on 17 October 1739.

Personal life
On 1 January 1707/8, Roxburghe was married to widow Lady Mary Savile. Lady Mary was the only child of Daniel Finch, 7th Earl of Winchilsea. From her first marriage to William Savile, 2nd Marquess of Halifax, she was the mother of Lady Mary Savile (who married Sackville Tufton, 7th Earl of Thanet in 1722) and Lady Dorothy Savile (who married Richard Boyle, 3rd Earl of Burlington). Together, John and Mary were the parents of:

 Robert Ker (–1755), who married his half-cousin Essex Mostyn, eldest daughter of Sir Roger Mostyn, 3rd Baronet.

The Duchess of Roxburghe died on 19 September 1718 and the Duke died on 27 February 1741. He was buried first in his family vault beneath Bowden Kirk.  Later his remains were relocated to the Roxburghe Aisle attached to Kelso Abbey.  Upon his death, his only son, who had been created Earl Ker of Wakefield in 1722, became 2nd duke.

Ancestry

References

1680 births
1741 deaths
1
Fellows of the Royal Society
John Ker, 1st Duke of Roxburghe
17th-century Scottish peers
Scottish representative peers
Members of the Privy Council of Great Britain
Knights of the Garter